Sergio Bartrina (born 2 December 1973) is a Spanish snowboarder. He competed in the men's halfpipe event at the 1998 Winter Olympics.

References

1973 births
Living people
Spanish male snowboarders
Olympic snowboarders of Spain
Snowboarders at the 1998 Winter Olympics
Place of birth missing (living people)
20th-century Spanish people